Karolewo  (German Carlshof) is a village in the administrative district of Gmina Kętrzyn, within Kętrzyn County, Warmian-Masurian Voivodeship, in northern Poland.

The village was the location of the Carlshof Institutions from 1882 to 1940 which served as the Wolfschanze hospital from 1941 to 1945.

The village has a population of 592.

References

Villages in Kętrzyn County